The 1979 Memphis State Tigers football team represented Memphis State University (now known as the University of Memphis) as an independent during the 1979 NCAA Division I-A football season. In its fifth season under head coach Richard Williamson, the team compiled a 5–6 record and was outscored by a total of 223 to 166. The team played its home games at Liberty Bowl Memorial Stadium in Memphis, Tennessee. 

The team's statistical leaders included Kevin Betts with 884 passing yards, Leo Cage with 599 rushing yards, Tony Hunt with 234 receiving yards, and Richard Locke with 30 points scored.

Schedule

References

Memphis State
Memphis Tigers football seasons
Memphis State Tigers football